The women's 3000 metres race of the 2014–15 ISU Speed Skating World Cup 5, arranged in the Vikingskipet arena in Hamar, Norway, was held on 1 February 2015.

Martina Sáblíková of the Czech Republic won, followed by Carlijn Achtereekte of the Netherlands in second place, and Ireen Wüst of the Netherlands in third place. Heather Richardson of the United States won Division B.

In the B division, Marina Zueva of Belarus set a national record as she finished second, and Elena Møller-Rigas of Denmark set a new national junior record.

Results
The race took place on Saturday, 1 February, with Division B scheduled in the morning session, at 09:15, and Division A scheduled in the afternoon session, at 13:15.

Division A

Division B

Note: NR = national record, NRJ = national record for juniors.

References

Women 3000
5